Monroe Railroad may refer to:
Monroe Railroad (1833–1836), predecessor of the Central of Georgia Railway
Its successor, the Monroe Railroad and Banking Company (1836–1845)
The affiliated Monroe Railroad Bank
Monroe Railroad (1904–1975), predecessor of the Georgia Railroad